Centennial Ice Arena is a 550-seat ice arena in Billings, Montana, USA. From 2006 to 2017, the arena played host to the city's only junior league hockey club, the Billings Bulls. It also hosts youth hockey and has been the home ice for the Montana Thunderblades, a USA Hockey Select youth team that won the 14U Tier II National Championship in 2014.

Public demand for a year-round facility to host youth and junior hockey in Billings prompted the arena's construction. Opened in 1981, Centennial Ice Arena replaced the outdoor King Avenue Ice Rink - the city's only fully maintained ice rink at the time. There are plans to abandon the arena in the near future, as it has a recent history of serious maintenance issues as well as an aging refrigeration system. The Billings Bulls ownership had been pursuing the possibility of two new rinks being built in Centennial Park (an unrelated public park in the city) as cost of repairs for the facility would be in excess of $750,000.

References

Indoor ice hockey venues in Montana
Sports venues in Billings, Montana
1981 establishments in Montana
Sports venues completed in 1981